A spider roll is a type of makizushi sushi that includes breaded or battered soft-shell crab and other ingredients such as cucumber, avocado, daikon sprouts or lettuce, and spicy mayonnaise, rolled inside nori and sushi rice.

Etymology
The dish's name is derived from the legs of the crab which stick out from the end of the roll, which looks somewhat like a spider. The dish's name is typically used in North America, and may be a rare find in other areas of the world.

References

American fusion cuisine
Sushi in the United States